A free and fair election is defined by political scientist Robert Dahl as an election in which "coercion is comparatively uncommon". A free and fair election involves political freedoms and fair processes leading up to the vote, a fair count of eligible voters who cast a ballot (including such aspects as electoral fraud or voter suppression), and acceptance of election results by all parties. An election may partially meet international standards for free and fair elections, or may meet some standards but not others.

A study published in 2016 of elections in 169 countries over the period 1975 to 2011 estimated that only about half of elections were free and fair. The study evaluated ten dimensions of the conduct of elections:

 legal framework (whether there was a constitutional right of citizens to vote and seek office, whether elections were held at regular intervals, and whether election-related laws were not changed immediately before an election)
 electoral management (whether gerrymandering occurred and whether election management bodies, if they existed, were independent, impartial, and accountable);
 electoral rights (whether citizens were generally able to vote on the basis of equal suffrage and access);
 voter registers (whether they were accurate, current, and open to voters for easy and effective voter registration);
 ballot access (whether candidates had in practice a right to compete in the election, with rejections of candidate applications being based on "internationally recognizable and acceptable norms" and with no candidate receiving more than 75% of the votes (an signal of malpractice or election boycotts);
 campaign process (whether elections were carried out without violence, intimidation, bribery (vote buying), use of government resources to advantage the incumbent, or a "massive financial advantages" for the incumbent;
 media access (whether freedom of speech was protected and whether the ruling party was disproportionately benefited by government-owned media; 
 voting process (whether elections were conducted by secret ballot on a one person, one vote basis, with adequate security to protect voters and protection against ballot box stuffing, multiple voting, destruction of valid ballots, and other forms of manipulation; 
 role of officials (whether the election was administered with adequately trained personnel, free from campaigning or intimidation at polling places, and with the ability of international election observers and party representatives to observe polling places; and 
 counting of votes (whether votes were tabulated transparently and free of fraud or tampering)

The 2016 study found that election quality decreased over time, primarily due to unfair election processes prior to election day. This was attributable to more non-democratic regimes holding elections over time; these elections sought to legitimize the regime's rule without incurring the risk of the regime actually losing power. Increased election observation over the period may have also led to more flawed elections being tallied.

The presence of election monitors and constraints on executive power increases the probability of a free and fair election by 31 percentage points. The presence of election monitors, however, may be an endogenous variable because democracies are more likely to invite election observers than non-democratic regimes.

See also
 Electoral integrity
 Unfair election

References

Further reading

External links
Explainer: Free and Fair Elections

Elections by type